The 1998–99 Kazakhstan Cup is the seventh season of the Kazakhstan Cup, the annual nationwide football cup competition of Kazakhstan since the independence of the country. The competition begins on 6 May 1998, and will end with the final in Jule 1999. Irtysh are the defending champions, having won their first cup in the 1997-98 competition.

First round

Quarter-finals

Semi-finals

Final
 

Kazakhstan Cup seasons
1999 domestic association football cups
Cup